Callens is a Flemish surname. Notable people with the surname include:

 Brigitta Callens (born 1980), Miss Belgium 1999
 Els Callens (born 1970), Belgian tennis player
 Norbert Callens (1924–2005) Belgian road bicycle racer
 Alexander Callens (born 1992) Peruvian footballer
 Joseph Callens (born 1894) Belgian swimmer and diver